Parafomoria is a genus of moths of the family Nepticulidae.

Species
Parafomoria cistivora  (Peyerimhoff 1871) 
Parafomoria fumanae A. & Z. Lastuvka 2005
Parafomoria halimivora van Nieukerken 1985
Parafomoria helianthemella  (Herrich-Schaffer 1860) 
Parafomoria ladaniphila  (Mendes 1910) 
Parafomoria liguricella  (Klimesch 1946) 
Parafomoria pseudocistivora van Nieukerken 1983
Parafomoria tingitella  (Walsingham 1904)

External links
Fauna Europaea

Nepticulidae
Monotrysia genera